Toxol is a toxic chemical compound found in Aplopappus heterophyllus and Werneria ciliolata.

See also 

 Tremetone, a closely related substance

References 

Toxins
Piceol ethers
Benzofurans